Høgni Madsen (born 1985) is a Faroese footballer who plays for B68 Toftir in Effodeildin as a midfielder.

He has earlier played for other Faroese clubs like EB/Streymur, ÍF Fuglafjørður and KÍ Klaksvík, and for the Icelandic clubs Fram Reykjavík and Þróttur Vogum. He has played three matches for the Faroe Islands national football team.

Individual Honours
Effodeildin Team of the Season: 2012

References

External links

Living people
1985 births
Faroese footballers
Faroe Islands international footballers
GÍ Gøta players
FC Suðuroy players
ÍF Fuglafjørður players
Association football midfielders
Faroe Islands youth international footballers
Þróttur Vogum players